The 500 metres speed skating event was part of the speed skating at the 1936 Winter Olympics programme. The competition was held on Tuesday, 11 February 1936. Thirty-six speed skaters from 14 nations competed.

Medalists

Records
These were the standing world and Olympic records (in seconds) prior to the 1936 Winter Olympics.

(*) The record was set on naturally frozen ice.

(**) This time was set in pack-style format, having all competitors skate at the same time.

Ivar Ballangrud equalized the Olympic record with 43.4 seconds.

Results

References

External links
Official Olympic Report
 

Speed skating at the 1936 Winter Olympics